Turkey Creek is an unincorporated community in Salem Township, Steuben County, in the U.S. state of Indiana.

History
A post office was established at Turkey Creek in 1852, and remained in operation until it was discontinued in 1900.

Geography

References

Unincorporated communities in Steuben County, Indiana
Unincorporated communities in Indiana